Zicrona is a genus of bugs of the family Pentatomidae. It was circumscribed by Charles Jean-Baptiste Amyot and Jean Guillaume Audinet-Serville

Amyot and Serville wrote the genus's name comes from the Hebrew word  meaning "odorant".

Species
, the following four species are recognized:
 Zicrona americana Thomas, 1992 
 Zicrona caerulea (Linnaeus, 1758) - Blue Bug 
 Zicrona hisarensis Chopra & Sucheta, 1984 
 Zicrona murreensis Rana & Ahmad, 1988

References

External links
 Fauna europaea

Asopinae
Taxa named by Charles Jean-Baptiste Amyot
Taxa named by Jean Guillaume Audinet-Serville
Pentatomidae genera